The Wight Seaplane was a British twin-float seaplane produced by J Samuel White & Company Limited (Wight Aircraft). It was also known as the Admiralty Type 840.

Design and development
Designed by Howard T Wright and built by the aircraft department of the shipbuilding company J Samuel White & Company Limited, the Wight Seaplane was a slightly smaller version (61 ft (18.59 m) span) of the Wight Pusher Seaplane. The aircraft was a conventional two-float seaplane with tandem open cockpits and a nose-mounted 225 hp (168 kW) Sunbeam engine. Fifty-two aircraft were built and delivered, and an extra 20 were produced as spares production being undertaken by Portholme Aviation and William Beardmore & Co., Ltd.

Operational history
The Wight Seaplane served with the RNAS at Dundee Felixstowe, Scapa Flow and Gibraltar, being used for anti-submarine patrols between 1915 and 1917.

Operators

 Royal Navy
Royal Naval Air Service

Specifications (Seaplane)

See also

References

1910s British military reconnaissance aircraft
Floatplanes
Wight aircraft
Single-engined tractor aircraft
Biplanes
Aircraft first flown in 1915